Gnanapuram is one of the residential areas in Visakhapatnam, Andhra Pradesh.

History
Gnanapuram is supposed to be the ancient neighbourhood of the city. Founded sometime in 1880 by the spiritual order of Roman Catholic Mission called Francis De Sales, whose first Bishop was Right Reverend Tissot, The Roman Catholic Mission, the church, educational institutions, and the economy prevailed in the 1880 and beyond.

Convent Junction
Convent Junction or Chavula Madhum is one of the notable name in Visakhapatnam from the old days. From Gajuwaka and Kancharapalem buses are passing this junction.

School
St. Peter's High School is a very famous school in Visakhapatnam. This is a very old school. This school is a Telugu(language) medium school with state curriculam(SSC) of Andhra Pradesh. St. Peter's High School is well known in the area as a quality public education provider for children from low and medium income families. This school also has its primary school division at the same location(Gnanapuram, Visakhapatnam).

Transport
Gnanapuram is a centrally located residential area beside Visakhapatnam Railway Station, and is well connected to all places in the city of Visakhapatnam.

References

Neighbourhoods in Visakhapatnam